The Swedish Paper Workers' Union (Pappers) is a trade union representing workers in the pulp and paper industry in Sweden.

The union was established on 21 June 1920, at a conference in Gävle.  It brought together 6,251 workers, most from the Swedish Factory Workers' Union, but a minority from the Swedish Sawmill Industry Workers' Union.  It affiliated to the Swedish Trade Union Confederation in 1922, and relocated its headquarters to Stockholm in 1928.  In 1946, the Swedish Pulp Operators' Union merged in, and it reached a peak membership of 47,228 in 1961.

The union's membership steadily dropped from the mid-1970s, along with employment in the industry.  As of 2019, Pontus Georgsson is the union's chairman. In the same year, it had 13,494 members.  As of 2005, the union had 70 local affiliates, one at each mill.

External links

References

Swedish Trade Union Confederation
International Federation of Chemical, Energy, Mine and General Workers' Unions
Trade unions in Sweden
1920 establishments in Sweden
Trade unions established in 1920
Paper industry trade unions